Angelo J. Puppolo Jr. is a politician from Springfield, Massachusetts. A Democrat, he currently serves as the 12th Hampden District representative in the Massachusetts House of Representatives.

He was elected to his first term in office in November 2006, defeating Wilbraham, Massachusetts Planning Board member Christopher Leisey, a Republican, in the general election. Prior to being elected to the Massachusetts House of Representatives, Puppolo served as a City Councilor in Springfield, MA. Puppolo is an attorney who graduated from Western New England College School of Law in 2001.

See also
 2019–2020 Massachusetts legislature
 2021–2022 Massachusetts legislature

References

External links
Official Website

Democratic Party members of the Massachusetts House of Representatives
Politicians from Springfield, Massachusetts
Living people
Western New England University alumni
Massachusetts city council members
21st-century American politicians
Year of birth missing (living people)